Lacadena is an unincorporated community in Lacadena Rural Municipality No. 228, Saskatchewan, Canada.

See also
 List of communities in Saskatchewan
 Hamlets of Saskatchewan

Lacadena No. 228, Saskatchewan
Unincorporated communities in Saskatchewan